is a former sumo wrestler and current professional wrestler from Chōyō, Kumamoto, Japan. In sumo, he used the shikona , while in professional wrestling he is known by the ring name .

Career

His parents ran a yakiniku restaurant. In junior high school Okamoto did judo and participated in prefectural competitions in the third grade. Amongst his opponents was the future top division sumo wrestler Chiyohakuho. Although he had no experience in sumo, he was spotted by scouts from the Michinoku stable and recommended to its stablemaster, ex ōzeki Kirishima. Okamoto was not aware of Kirishima's sumo career but was convinced by his passion for sumo to join Michinoku stable. He made his professional debut in March 1999. He scored six wins against just one loss in his first official tournament. He came close to promotion to the sekitori level in May 2006 with a 4–3 record at makushita #3 but missed out and had to wait until November 2007 when a 5–2 at makushita #4 earned him promotion to the jūryō division. He was the first member of Michinoku stable to do so since ex-Kirishima took over the stable in 1997. In his jūryō debut in January 2008 he lost eight bouts in the first ten days but then recovered to win his last five matches in a row. However, after losing scores in three tournaments from January to May 2010 he was demoted back to makushita.  He never reached the top division, and the highest rank he achieved was jūryō 4. His career record over 72 tournaments was 310 wins against 291 losses.

Retirement from sumo
He was forced to retire by the Japan Sumo Association in April 2011,  after an investigation showed his name had appeared in text messages along with several other wrestlers who were prepared to throw bouts. In January 2012 he became a professional wrestler with a ring name of Shogun Okamoto and joined the Inoki Genome Federation. In February 2012 he won his first match, defeating Bob Sapp. In October 2013 he formed a  tag team with another former sumo wrestler, Wakakirin. He left IGF in March 2016 and went freelance. In July he joined Akebono and Ryota Hama's tag team "SMOP", as part of which he won his first title, the NWA Intercontinental Tag Team Championship, in February 2017.

His parents' home was destroyed in the 2016 Kumamoto earthquakes, although no one was injured.

Fighting style
Wakakirin's favourite techniques were tsuppari (a series of rapid thrusts to the opponent's chest) and yori (force out). When fighting on the mawashi or belt he preferred a hidari-yotsu (right hand outside, left hand inside) grip.

Career record

Championships and accomplishments

Professional wrestling
Big Japan Pro Wrestling
Yokohama Shopping Street 6-Man Tag Team Championship (1 time) – with Ryota Hama and Yasufumi Nakanoue
Pro Wrestling Zero1
NWA Intercontinental Tag Team Championship (2 times) – with Akebono (1) and Yutaka Yoshie (1)
NWA United National Heavyweight Championship (1 time)
Furinkazan Tag Tournament (2017) – with Yutaka Yoshie
Real Japan Pro Wrestling
UWA Asia Pacific Heavyweight Championship (2 times, current)

See also
Glossary of sumo terms
List of past sumo wrestlers

References

External links

1983 births
Living people
Japanese sumo wrestlers
Sumo people from Kumamoto Prefecture
Japanese male professional wrestlers
Sportspeople banned for life
21st-century professional wrestlers
Yokohama Shopping Street 6-Man Tag Team Champions